Jens Olai Steffensen (23 March 1891 – 17 October 1961) was a Norwegian politician for the Labour Party.

He was elected to the Norwegian Parliament from Nordland in 1934, and was re-elected on four occasions.

Steffensen was born in Bø, Nordland and a member of Bø municipality council from 1925 to 1928, and then served as deputy mayor during the terms 1934–1937 and 1937–1941 as well as mayor in 1945.

References

1891 births
1961 deaths
Labour Party (Norway) politicians
Members of the Storting
20th-century Norwegian politicians
People from Bø, Nordland